Don Serafín María de Sotto y Abbach, 3rd Count of Clonard and 5th Marquis of la Granada (12 October 1793, in Barcelona, Spain – 23 February 1862, in Madrid, Spain) was a Spanish noble, politician, writer and statesman who served as Prime Minister of Spain for one day in October 1849. Elder son of Raimundo de Sotto, 2nd Count of Clonard and Ramona Abbach, 4th Marquise of la Granada, he was of Irish patrilineal descent, a descendant of John Sutton, 1st Baron Dudley. In Spain, the family name had been Hispanicized as Sotto.

Works
Memoria para la Historia de las tropas de la Casa Real de España (1824).
Memoria histórica de las academias militares de España (1847).
Historia orgánica de las armas de Infantería y Caballería españolas (1851–1859).
Álbum de la Infantería española (1861).
Álbum de la Caballería española (1861).

References

Catalan Encyclopedia. Serafín de Sotto.
The 3rd Count of Clonard at the House of Sutton's official site.
Personal dossier of the Count of Clonard. Spanish Senate.

|-

|-

|-

Prime Ministers of Spain
Counts of Spain
Marquesses of Spain
Chevaliers of the Légion d'honneur
Spanish people of Irish descent
1793 births
1862 deaths
Moderate Party (Spain) politicians
19th-century Spanish politicians